Hastings Bertrand Lees-Smith PC (26 January 1878 – 18 December 1941) was a British Liberal turned Labour politician who was briefly in the cabinet as President of the Board of Education in 1931. He was the acting Leader of the Opposition and Leader of the Labour Party (as chairman of the Parliamentary Labour Party) from 1940 until his death, during the time Clement Attlee was in government.

Family background
Lees-Smith was from an army family. His father was a major in the Royal Artillery and he was born in British India. He was educated at Aldenham School, as a cadet at the Royal Military Academy, Woolwich, and Queen's College, Oxford. Rejecting a military career, he chose academia and was appointed as a lecturer in Public Administration at the London School of Economics in 1906, where he remained throughout his political career. He was also Chairman of the Executive Committee of Ruskin College, Oxford, from 1907 to 1909. He resigned on appointment as Professor of Public Administration at the University of Bristol.

In 1909, he went on an extended tour of India to lecture at Bombay on economics and advise on economics teaching. As a result of his experiences he wrote Studies in Indian Economics. He joined a territorial regiment in 1915, and was wounded as a stretcher bearer on the Western Front and invalided out of the armed forces in 1917.

In 1938, he distributed 40 British passports to German Jews in Frankfurt, thus aiding their escape. The Chest of Surprises describes the Lees-Smith family history.

Liberal Party
At the January 1910 general election, Lees-Smith was elected as a Liberal for the two-member Northampton constituency. Unlike his fellow Northampton MP, Charles McCurdy, Lees-Smith allied with H. H. Asquith rather than David Lloyd George in the Liberal split during the First World War and, as a consequence, was not offered support by the Coalition in the 1918 general election. Rather than defend Northampton (which had been reduced to one member), he moved to the new Don Valley constituency but lost to a Coalition-supported National Democratic and Labour Party candidate. Indicating his estrangement from the Liberal Party, he fought as an "Independent Radical", even though he had been adopted by the local Liberal association. He was the member of Parliament who, in July 1917, read Siegfried Sassoon's declaration that the First World War had continued too long and should be ended.

Labour Party
In 1919, Lees-Smith joined the Labour Party. He was picked as Labour candidate for Keighley and won the seat in the 1922 general election, profiting from a divided opposition. He was a noted speaker on banking and on reform of the House of Lords, about which he wrote several books including Second Chambers in Theory and Practice (1923). Unfortunately for Lees-Smith, the Conservatives did not stand a candidate in the 1923 general election and he was defeated by the Liberal candidate. That defeat prevented him from being appointed as a Minister in the first Labour government.

Ministerial office
The collapse of the Liberal Party in the 1924 general election meant that Lees-Smith won his seat back, and he was swiftly appointed to a frontbench role. When Labour returned to office in 1929, he was made Postmaster-General. In that role, he defended the nationalised Post Office and tried to smarten up Post Office counters. In a reshuffle in March 1931, he was promoted to President of the Board of Education and sworn of the Privy Council. In that capacity, in June he gave the opening address at the Second International Congress of the History of Science. He had only a brief time in office before the government fell, and Lees-Smith refused to follow Ramsay MacDonald into the National Government.

Defeated again in 1931, Lees-Smith again won his seat back in 1935. He served on the front bench but was not invited by Winston Churchill to join the Coalition government in 1940. As one of the most senior Labour figures not in office, the responsibilities of running the party were given to him. In his partisan role he strongly supported Churchill's conduct as war leader even if the war was not always running in the Allies' favour.

References

 Obituary, The Times, 19 December 1941

External links
 

1878 births
1941 deaths
Academics of the London School of Economics
Alumni of The Queen's College, Oxford
British Secretaries of State for Education
Graduates of the Royal Military Academy, Woolwich
Labour Party (UK) MPs for English constituencies
Liberal Party (UK) MPs for English constituencies
Members of the Privy Council of the United Kingdom
People educated at Aldenham School
UK MPs 1910
UK MPs 1910–1918
UK MPs 1922–1923
UK MPs 1924–1929
UK MPs 1929–1931
UK MPs 1935–1945
United Kingdom Postmasters General
British people in colonial India